Fear is a novel by Anatoly Rybakov that recounts the era in the Soviet Union of the build-up to the 'Congress of the Victors', the early years of the second Five Year Plan and the (supposed) circumstances of the murder of Sergey Kirov prior to the beginning of the Great Purge. It is the second book of the trilogy, preceded by Children of the Arbat and followed by Dust and Ashes.

References

Novels by Anatoly Rybakov
1990 novels
Novels about political repression in the Soviet Union
Works originally published in Russian newspapers